WFNS may stand for:

WFNS (AM), a radio station (1350 AM) licensed to Blackshear, Georgia, United States
WNEZ, a radio station (1230 AM) licensed to Manchester, Connecticut, United States, which held the call sign WFNS in 1989
World Federation of Neurosurgical Societies, a scientific, non-governmental organization of neurosurgeons
The WFNS classification, a scale gauging severity of symptoms in subarachnoid hemorrhage
Writers' Federation of Nova Scotia, a non-profit charitable organization promoting creative writing and the profession of writing in the Canadian province of Nova Scotia